Raziabad may refer to:

Raziabad, Ardabil
Raziabad, Hamadan
Raziabad, Jiroft, Kerman Province
Raziabad, Sarduiyeh, Jiroft County, Kerman Province
Raziabad, Lorestan
Raziabad, Markazi
Raziabad, Shazand, Markazi Province
Raziabad, Qazvin
Raziabad, Damghan, Semnan Province
Raziabad, Tehran
Raziabad-e Bala, Tehran Province
Raziabad-e Pain, Tehran Province

See also
Rezaabad (disambiguation)
Rizaabad (disambiguation)